Xavier (Xabier in Basque and Navarro-Aragonese; and Javier in Castilian) is a town and municipality located in the province and autonomous community of Navarre, northern Spain, with a population of 112. The name is the Romanized form of the original Etxeberri (Basque for "new house").

It is renowned for being home to the Castle of Xavier, partially demolished in 1516 and later restored, and an attached Basilica. It is the ultimate origin of the given name Xabier / Xavier.

Famous residents
Saint Francis Xavier

References

External links

 XAVIER in the Bernardo Estornés Lasa - Auñamendi Encyclopedia (Euskomedia Fundazioa) 

Municipalities in Navarre
Cultural tourism in Spain